DYAM may refer to:
 DYAM-FM, an FM radio station broadcasting in Toledo, Cebu, branded as Hope Radio
 DYAM-TV, a GMA Network station broadcasting in Roxas, Capiz